Miguel Mauricio Ramírez Pérez (born 11 June 1970), nicknamed "Cheíto", is a Chilean football manager and former player who played as a defender. He is the current manager of Universidad de Concepción in the Primera B de Chile.

Ramírez was capped 62 times and scored 1 goal for the Chile national team between 1991 and 2003, including three games at the 1998 FIFA World Cup.

Career
Ramírez started his career in 1991 with Colo-Colo, where he was part of two league championship winning campaigns in 1991 and 1993. During his time with the club, it also won the Copa Libertadores in 1991, Copa Interamericana 1991 and Recopa Sudamericana in 1992.

Ramírez played in Spain with Real Sociedad and in Mexico with C.F. Monterrey before returning to Chile in 1997 to join Universidad Católica. At Universidad Católica, he won a further two league championships. He spent his last years as a professional back at Colo-Colo.

Honours

Club
Colo-Colo
 Primera División de Chile (2): 1991, 1993
 Copa Libertadores (1): 1991
 Recopa Sudamericana (1): 1992
 Copa Interamericana (1): 1992

Universidad Católica
 Primera División de Chile (1):  2002 Apertura

References

External links

1970 births
Living people
Footballers from Santiago
Association football defenders
Chilean footballers
Chilean expatriate footballers
Chile international footballers
Chilean football managers
Chilean Primera División players
La Liga players
Liga MX players
Colo-Colo footballers
Real Sociedad footballers
C.F. Monterrey players
Club Deportivo Universidad Católica footballers
Copa Libertadores-winning players
Chilean Primera División managers
Primera B de Chile managers
San Luis de Quillota managers
Santiago Wanderers managers
O'Higgins F.C. managers
Universidad de Concepción managers
Expatriate footballers in Spain
Chilean expatriate sportspeople in Spain
Expatriate footballers in Mexico
Chilean expatriate sportspeople in Mexico
1998 FIFA World Cup players
1991 Copa América players
1993 Copa América players
1995 Copa América players
1999 Copa América players
2004 Copa América players